The third season of Your Face Sounds Familiar was a singing and impersonation competition for celebrities based on the Spanish version of the same name. It first aired on February 20, 2021, on Kapamilya Channel and A2Z. Sharon Cuneta and Gary Valenciano reprised their roles as judges while Ogie Alcasid, a judge in the Kids seasons replaced Jed Madela as judge whom reprised his role as mentor in the second season of the Kids edition  alongside Nyoy Volante. Due to prior commitments with blocktimer shows that are aired on TV5, Billy Crawford could not be the host of the third season. Because of this, Luis Manzano hosted the third season instead. This is also the first season to not air on ABS-CBN due to its shutdown and franchise denial in 2020, instead airing on the two aforementioned platforms and Kapamilya Online Live.

After 13 weeks of competition, Klarisse de Guzman emerged as the winner after attaining a total combined score of 90.00%. This is the first and currently only regular season to adopt the scoring system used in the finales of the Kids Editions.

Development
The season was confirmed in December 2020 during the Ikaw ang Liwanang at Ligaya: The ABS-CBN Christmas Special 2020. It was also confirmed that Luis Manzano will be the new host following Billy Crawford's departure from ABS-CBN following the network's aforementioned shutdown, denial and layoffs. This season marked the first regular season in five years after two consecutive seasons of the children's edition. The jury from the Kids seasons was retained for Season 3.

In 2021, the show revealed its first teaser along with the new title card and logo. The taping of the show's first three episodes started sometime in late January 2021.

Sharon Cuneta later confirmed that Jed Madela and Nyoy Volante will reprise their previous roles as mentors for vocals and choreography. Madela was replaced by Ogie Alcasid as a judge.

On February 4, 2021, the celebrity performers were announced.

It was also confirmed that Darren Espanto and AC Bonifacio will host the show's online companion show titled Your Face Sounds Familiar: KaFamiliar Online Live.

Impact of the COVID-19 pandemic on the season 
Due to the then-continuing impacts of the COVID-19 pandemic in the Philippines, the show implemented several health and safety protocols in the studio to ensure the safety of the artists, crew and staff from COVID-19. The show also entails a nearly week-long lock-in taping set-up to produce three weeks of episodes per taping cycle, being taped without any studio audience. Instead, a virtual audience via Zoom is admitted instead while using artificial crowd noise, while Darren Espanto and AC Bonifacio hosted the online companion show through Remote work also via Zoom.

Following the sudden surge of COVID-19 cases in the Greater Manila Area caused by the UK (B.1.1.7) COVID-19 variant (later known as the Alpha Variant), which resulted in a reimposition of the enhanced community quarantine in the aforementioned areas, the show temporarily suspended tapings of new episodes during the said period, and Director's cut versions of several past episodes of the season were aired instead on April 4, 10 and 11. The show’s taping of new episodes resumed on April 14, 2021, while rehearsals for the third taping cycle started on April 12, 2021, following the downgrade to modified enhanced community quarantine.

After six weeks of being part of the show, Jhong Hilario, one of the contestants, chose to quit the show due to the pandemic. He mentioned that he made the decision for the wellbeing of his newborn baby, as babies are among those who are susceptible to the coronavirus.

Geneva Cruz was also unable to work for three weeks (Week 7-9) due to her exposure to COVID-19. This occurred after her mother was confirmed to have contracted the virus and subsequently died.

Hosts, judges, and mentors

Host
Luis Manzano served as the new host, replacing Billy Crawford due to the latter's departure from the network.

Online show hosts
The show's online companion show, Your Face Sounds Familiar: KaFamiliar Online Live is hosted by Darren Espanto and Kids Season 1 contestant AC Bonifacio. It airs simultaneously with the main show, being streamed live on the official YouTube channel of the show and through Kapamilya Online Live.

Awra Briguela or Jeremy Glinoga occasionally served as substitute hosts whenever Bonifacio or Espanto are unable to host the online companion show.

Jeremy Glinoga co-hosted the online show along with Bonifacio and Espanto in The Grand Showdown on May 29, 2021.

Judges
The judges, dubbed as "The Jury" in the show:

The Jury
 Ogie Alcasid
 Sharon Cuneta
 Gary Valenciano

Guest judges
Jed Madela (Cuneta's replacement judge for Week 7)

Mentors
Jed Madela and Nyoy Volante reprised their previous roles as mentors, Jed for vocals and Nyoy for choreography, respectively, after being introduced as new mentors in the second season of the Kids edition.

Performers
The contestants and their monikers were revealed on February 4, 2021 Jhong Hilario decided to withdraw on Week 7, becoming the first to do so in the show's history, leaving seven performers competing for the grand prize from then on.

Results summary
The table below shows the corresponding total points earned per week. Each performance is ranked in two parts. In the first part, The Jury gives 1 to 8 points to the performers. In the second part, all of the performers give 3 points to another contestant other than them.

Legend

Performances

Week 1 (February 20 & 21)
Episode Hashtag
 #YourFacePH2021 (Saturday)
 #YFSFKaFamiliarForever (Sunday)

Week 2 (February 27 & 28)
Episode Hashtag
 #YFSF3KaFUNabik (Saturday)
 #YFSF3FUNaloTo (Sunday)
Non-Competition Performance

 Luis Manzano as Andrew E. – "Andrew Ford Medina"

Week 3 (March 6 & 7) 
Episode Hashtag
 #YFSF3FUNtastic (Saturday)
 #YFSF3FUNmalakasan (Sunday)

Week 4 (March 13 & 14) 
Episode Hashtag
 #YFSFWomanPower (Saturday)
 #YFSFLakasNgPinay (Sunday)

Non-Competition Performance

 Ogie Alcasid as himself as Eydie Waw – "Maga Ako, Manas Ako"

Notes
 Despite Lil' Kim being part of the collaboration that sang "Lady Marmalade", she wasn't impersonated as the iDolls are a trio and not a quartet.
 Although the original version of "Bawal Lumabas" played in the iconizer, the Brian Cua Summer Anthem Mix arrangement was used in the performance.

Week 5 (March 20 & 21) 
Episode Hashtag
 #YFSFLakas (Saturday)
 #YFSFiba (Sunday)

Week 6 (March 27 & 28) 
Episode Hashtag
 #YFSFHOTawNa (Saturday)
 #YFSFSlayCation (Sunday)

Week 7 (April 17 & 18) 
Jhong Hilario announced his withdrawal from the show on April 17, 2021 because of his newborn. Geneva Cruz was not able to perform for this week and the following two weeks following her mother's exposure to COVID-19.

Due to the absences, the highest score a member of the jury can give to a contestant is 6.

Episode Hashtag
 #YFSFCelebration (Saturday)
 #YFSFPambansangParty (Sunday)
Guest Juror

 Jed Madela (temporary replacement for Sharon Cuneta)
Non-Competition Performance

To celebrate Luis Manzano's birthday, Nyoy Volante impersonated Vilma Santos.

 Nyoy Volante as Vilma Santos - Breaking Up Is Hard To Do

Week 8 (April 24 & 25) 
Due to undisclosed reasons, Sharon Cuneta appeared virtually through a work-from-home setup via Zoom. This would continue on the following week.

Episode Hashtag
 #YFSFGoodVibes (Saturday)
 #YFSFHotHotHot (Sunday)

Non-Competition Performances
 Jed Madela as Boy George of Culture Club - "Karma Chameleon"
 Gary Valenciano - "Make Us Whole Again"

Week 9 (May 1 & 2) 

Episode Hashtag
 #YFSFWerkIt (Saturday)
 #YFSFBilib (Sunday)
Non-Competition Performance
 Ogie Alcasid as himself as Ban Sot Mee - "Tabakoo Na Bes"

Notes

 Despite Gladys Knight being part of the collaboration that sang "That's What Friends Are For", She wasn't impersonated as the iDolls are a trio and not a quartlet.

Week 10 (May 8 & 9) 
After 3 weeks of her absence, Cruz returned to the competition. Her icon was revealed via a television screen in the training room as she wasn't able to press the iconizer in the previous weeks.

Episode Hashtag

 #YFSFLevelUp (Saturday)
 #YFSFInaAbangan (Sunday)

Non-Competition Performance
 Darren Espanto - "Hataw Na"

Week 11 (May 15 & 16) 
Episode Hashtag

 #YFSFFuntastic (Saturday)
 #YFSFFeelGoodPilipinas (Sunday)

Non-Competition Performance
 AC Bonifacio - TikTok Hits

Week 12 (May 22 & 23) 
Episode Hashtag

 #YFSFShowstoppers (Saturday)
 #YFSFRoadToFinale (Sunday)

Note:

 Geneva Cruz was the first contestant of a regular season to get all 3 points from her fellow contestants

The Grand Showdown: Week 13 (May 29 & 30) 
The finale of the season, dubbed as the Grand Showdown was held on May 29 and 30 at Studio 10, ABS-CBN Broadcasting Center due to the continuing impacts of COVID-19 in the country. All remaining contestants were chosen to compete in the Grand Showdown unlike in previous regular seasons where 3 to 4 contestants were eliminated the week before the finale. Unlike in previous weeks where the iconizer assigns the icons to the contestants, the contestants handpicked the icon they impersonated for the Grand Showdown.

As Sharon Cuneta is on her vacation, she appeared virtually through a work-from-home setup via Zoom.

With Reposposa impersonating Dulce, Season 3 became the first regular season where an OPM Icon was impersonated in the Grand Showdown.

The winner is determined via a score composed of two parts, one being the total points accumulated by the contestant from Weeks 1 to 12, and the other being the votes cast by the public. The contestant receiving the highest combined score wins the season and receives 1 million pesos, a house and lot from Lessandra and a trophy.

With Klarisse De Guzman attaining the highest score, she was declared the winner at the end of the night and sang her winning performance to end the season.

Episode Hashtag
 #YFSFGrandShowdown (Saturday)
 #YFSFGrandWinner (Sunday)
Non-Competition Performances

May 29

 Nyoy Volante, Jed Madela, Ogie Alcasid, Gary Valenciano, AC Bonifacio and the finalists - "Feel This Moment"/"Good Time"

May 30

 Vice Ganda and Regine Velasquez-Alcasid - "Crazy for You"

Specials 
Due to restrictions established by the Enhanced Community Quarantine that was in effect from March 29 to April 11 in the Greater Manila Area resulting in a suspension of tapings of newer episodes, no new performances were aired from April 4 to 11. Instead, performances from the previous weeks were re-aired.

April 4 
Due to Holy Week pre-empting regular programming from Thursday to Saturday, the Sunday episode was supposed to air duet performances. However, due to the then recently imposed Enhanced Community Quarantine over the Greater Manila Area that became the result of the surge of new COVID-19 cases in the aforementioned area, the plans for a duet week was cancelled and a director's cut version of Week 1's episodes was aired instead for that night.

Episode Hashtag
 #YourFacePH2021 (Sunday)
Performances
 iDolls as Hagibis - "Katawan"
 Vivoree Esclito as Sarah Geronimo - "Tala"
 Klarisse De Guzman as Christina Aguilera - "Dirrty"
 Jhong Hilario as apl.de.ap of The Black Eyed Peas - "Bebot"
 Christian Bables as Adam Levine - "Sugar"
 Lie Reposposa as Moira Dela Torre - "Titibo-Tibo"
 CJ Navato as Jose Mari Chan - "Beautiful Girl"
 Geneva Cruz as Jennifer Lopez - "On The Floor"

April 10 & 11 
Episode Hashtag
 #YFSFSakalam (Saturday)
 #YFSFPinoyPower (Sunday)

Performances
April 10
 Jhong Hilario as Tina Turner - "Proud Mary" (Week 4)
iDolls as Boyz II Men - "Color of Love" (Week 6)
 Christian Bables as Cher - "Strong Enough" (Week 2)
 Vivoree Esclito as Rihanna - "Shut Up and Drive" (Week 6)

April 11
 CJ Navato as Rico J. Puno - "Macho Gwapito" (Week 3)
 Geneva Cruz as Pilita Corrales - "Kapantay ay Langit" (Week 2)
 Lie Reposposa	as Sheryn Regis - "Kailan Kaya" (Week 5)
 Klarisse de Guzman as Jaya - "Hanggang Dito Na Lang" (Week 3)

References

Your Face Sounds Familiar (Philippine TV series)
2021 Philippine television seasons